Barmer may refer to the following places:

Barmer district, a district of Rajasthan state, India
Barmer (Lok Sabha constituency), a Lok Sabha parliamentary constituency of Rajasthan
Barmer, Rajasthan, a city in Barmer district
Barmer Taluka
Barmer (Rajasthan Assembly constituency), a state assembly constituency of Rajasthan 
Barmer, Norfolk, a village in the parish of Bagthorpe with Barmer
Barmer, Denmark, a village in Aalborg Municipality, Denmark
Barmer Spitze, a mountain on the border between Tyrol, Austria, and South Tyrol, Italy